The Indiana Wing Civil Air Patrol (abbreviated INWG) is the highest echelon of Civil Air PatrolAir Patrol in the state of Indiana. Its headquarters is located in Terre Haute, Indiana. The Indiana Wing involves 1045 adult and youth volunteers organized into four group headquarters, a legislative squadron, and twenty-six subordinate squadrons located throughout the state, including three School Enrichment Programs.  Civil Air Patrol's 2nd largest cadet squadron, the Anderson Preparatory Academy Cadet Squadron (GLR-IN-803), is located in Anderson, Indiana.

Missions
Indiana Wing performs Civil Air Patrol's three congressionally assigned key missions: emergency services, which includes search and rescue (by air and ground) and disaster relief operations; aerospace education for youth and the general public; and cadet programs for teenage youth.

Indiana Wing support's Civil Air Patrol's Emergency Services missions by flying ten Civil Air Patrol aircraft and operating thirteen vehicles and two mission support trailers.  The Wing operates 13 high frequency (HF) radios, and 15 very high frequency (VHF) repeaters and 113 VHF base and mobile radios.  Indiana Wing is involved in search and rescue, disaster relief, and counterdrug operations.

Indiana Wing offers the CAP Cadet Program in a number of communities across the state, and provides a free orientation flight program that has involved nearly 400 cadets in recent years.

Support for CAP's Aerospace Education mission includes outreach to schools, education for cadets, and participation in local aviation events. Additionally, Indiana Wing maintains a hot air balloon for aviation education and community outreach.

Organizational structure

Indiana Wing is organized into a wing headquarters unit, four group headquarters overseeing 26 squadrons, and a legislative squadron. In addition, the Anderson Preparatory Academy Cadet Squadron reports directly to the wing headquarters.

The four group headquarters are aligned with Indiana's Department of Homeland Security districts and have oversight for the squadrons within those districts.

 Indiana Group I:  IDHS Districts 1, 2, and 4
 Indiana Group III: IDHS Districts 3 and 6.
 Indiana Group V: IDHS District V.
 Indiana Group XII: IDHS Districts 7, 8, 9, and 10.

Past Wing Commanders

Spaatz Award Recipients

The General Carl A. Spaatz Award is the highest award in the Civil Air Patrol cadet program.  The award honors General Carl A. Spaatz, who was the first Chief of Staff of the United States Air Force and the second National Commander of Civil Air PatrolAir Patrol.

First awarded in 1964, only 0.5% of CAP cadets ever earn the Spaatz award. Indiana Wing ranks 18th among the 50 U.S. states in the number of Spaatz awards earned. Award recipients from Indiana include:

Legal protection
Under Indiana law, private employers whose businesses are within the borders of Indiana are forbidden from disciplining their employees who are members of the Indiana Wing, if those employees miss work in order to respond to an emergency as a part of Civil Air PatrolAir Patrol. Private employers are only exempted from this rule if they designate an employee as an "essential employee to the employer," and the state commander of the Indiana Wing must be notified.

The State of Indiana and all political subdivision of the state do not have a right to seek an exemption to giving Civil Air Patrol employees leave time by designating them an "essential employee to the employer." Rather, they are forbidden from penalizing any employee who takes leave from their work responsibilities to respond to a Civil Air Patrol mission.

All Indiana secondary school students, whether public or private, are entitled to leave from school to participate in Civil Air Patrol training and missions. Schools are forbidden by law from marking these students as absent or penalizing them in any way.

See also
Indiana Air National Guard
Indiana Guard Reserve
Civil Air Patrol

References

External links 
 www.inwg.cap.gov official site

Wings of the Civil Air Patrol
Education in Indiana
Military in Indiana